Kıraç is a Turkish surname. Notable people with the surname include:

 Kıraç (singer) (born 1972), Turkish musician
 Cahit Kıraç (born 1956), Turkish politician
 Güven Kıraç (born 1960), Turkish actor
 Seval Kıraç (born 1988), Turkish women's footballer

Arts
 Abbreviation of Keeping It Real Art Critics

Turkish-language surnames